Cham Khalaf-e Isa District is a district (bakhsh) in Hendijan County, Khuzestan Province, Iran. At the 2006 census, its population was 7,217, in 1,424 families.  The district has one city: Zahreh.  The district has two rural districts (dehestan): Cham Khalaf-e Isa Rural District and Soviren Rural District.

References 

Hendijan County
Districts of Khuzestan Province